Scrobipalpopsis is a genus of moth in the family Gelechiidae.

Species
 Scrobipalpopsis arnicella (Clarke, 1942)
 Scrobipalpopsis interposita Powell & Povolný, 2001
 Scrobipalpopsis madiae Powell & Povolný, 2001
 Scrobipalpopsis petasitis (Pfaffenzeller, 1867)
 Scrobipalpopsis petrella (Busck, 1915)
 Scrobipalpopsis tetradymiella (Busck, 1903)

References

 
Gnorimoschemini